Matteo Cavagna may refer to:

Matteo Cavagna (footballer born 1984), Italian footballer who plays for Foligno
Matteo Cavagna (footballer born 1985), Italian footballer who plays for Prato